The Mermaid and the Boy (Gutten, Havfruen og Ridder Rød; German: Der Knabe, die Meerfrau und Ritter Roth) is a Sámi fairy tale collected by Josef Calasanz Poestion in Lapplandische Märchen (Wein; 1886). Andrew Lang included an English-language version in The Brown Fairy Book (1904).

It is Aarne-Thompson type 531.  Other tales of this type include Ferdinand the Faithful and Ferdinand the Unfaithful, Corvetto, King Fortunatus's Golden Wig, and The Firebird and Princess Vasilisa.  Another, literary variant is Madame d'Aulnoy's La Belle aux cheveux d'or, or The Story of Pretty Goldilocks.

Synopsis

A king, having been married a year, set out to settle disputes among some distant subjects.  His ship, caught in a storm, was about to founder on the rocks when a mermaid appeared and promised to save him if he, in turn, would promise to give her his firstborn child. As the sea became more and more threatening, the king finally agreed.

On his return to his kingdom, he found his first son had been born and he told the queen what he had promised. They raised their son and when the youth was 16, the king and queen decided to have him leave home so the mermaid would not be able to find him when she came to collect on the promise. The king and queen sent the prince out into the world.

On his first night, the young prince met a hungry lion and shared his food with the beast; the lion repaid the kindness by giving him the tip of its ear and told him this gift would help him transform himself into a lion if he so wished. The prince turned himself into a lion the following day and traveled that way until he tired of it and turned himself back into a man. That night, the same thing happened with a bear asking for food and repaying the kindness with the tip of his ear that would turn the prince into a bear if he so wished. The following day, after he shared his food with a bumblebee he was given a hair from its wing that would transform the prince into a bee so he could fly all day without tiring.

The prince continued his adventure and arrived at a city where there lived a young princess who hated all men and would not permit one in her presence.  When everyone had retired for the night, the prince turned himself into a bee and flew into the princess's room.  He turned himself back into a man and the princess shrieked, but when the guards ran in to protect her they found nothing, so they left. Once again the prince turned himself into a man and the princess screamed, the guards returned, found nothing and left, this time deciding she was crazy and they would ignore her future screams. So when the prince once more became a man, the guards did not respond to the princess's cries.

The prince wooed the princess and she fell in love with him.  She told him that in three days, her father would go to war and leave his sword behind. Whoever brought it to him would gain her hand.  He agreed to do so, and told her if he did not return, she should play a violin on the seashore loudly enough to reach the bottom of the sea.

The prince left for war with the king, and when the king discovered he had not brought his sword, he promised his entourage that whoever brought his sword back to him would have the hand of the princess and would inherit the throne. The young prince and other knights took off for the city to retrieve the sword, The prince got ahead by frightening off the other knights by transforming himself into a lion.

When he reached the palace, the princess gave him the sword and broke her ring into two, giving him one ring and keeping the other to signify their betrothal. Leaving the palace he encountered the Red Knight who tried to take the sword from him by force but failed. Soon afterwards, however, the prince stopped for a drink at a stream and the mermaid, realizing he was the prince who was promised to her, grabbed him and brought him with her to the bottom of the sea. The Red Knight found the sword and carried it off to the king to claim his prize.

Soon the war was over, and the king returned to his kingdom and told the princess she must marry the Red Knight.  During the wedding feast, the princess, recalling what the prince had told her, went to the shore and played her violin. The mermaid heard her song but the prince claimed not to hear it and asked the mermaid to raise him higher and higher in the sea so he could hear.  On reaching   the surface, the prince transformed himself into a bee and flew to the princess who carried him away.

The princess brought the prince to the feast and challenged the Red Knight to turn himself into a lion, a bear, and a bee, at all three of which he failed. She then asked the prince to do so and he did all three.  The princess told her father that it was the prince who retrieved the sword and showed him their matching rings.  The king hanged the Red Knight, and the prince and princess were married.

Commentary

While the animals who give return are a frequent motif—"The Grateful Beasts", "The Two Brothers", "The Queen Bee", "The Death of Koschei the Deathless", "The Gold-bearded Man"—in most cases they come to the hero's aid themselves.  These animals fulfill a role more commonly found in fairy godmothers and like creatures, of giving the hero magical things that he may use.

The story also has many similarities to the Scottish Fairytale "The Sea-Maiden".

See also
Nix Nought Nothing
The Battle of the Birds
The Grateful Prince
The Nixie of the Mill-Pond
The Sea-Maiden
The White Dove

References

Further reading
 Hubrich-Messow, Gundula. "Ritter Rot, Bryde und Lunkentus: Von falschen Helden und heimlichen Helfern in skandinavischen Märchen". In: Bleckwenn, Helga (Hg.). Märchenfiguren in der Literatur des Nordund Ostseeraumes (Schriftenreihe Ringvorlesungen der Märchen-Stiftung Walther Kahn 11). Baltmannsweiler: Schneider Verlag Hohengehren, 2011. IX. pp. 131-154.

Mermaid And The Boy
Fiction about shapeshifting
ATU 500-559